Workington is a constituency in Cumbria represented in the House of Commons of the UK Parliament since 2019 by Mark Jenkinson, a Conservative.

Boundaries
The constituency covers much of the north-west of Cumbria, corresponding largely to the Allerdale borough, except for the areas around Wigton and Keswick. As well as Workington itself, the constituency contains the towns of Cockermouth, Maryport, Aspatria and Silloth.

Boundary review
1918–1950: The Municipal Borough of Workington, the Urban Districts of Arlecdon and Frizington, Aspatria, Harrington, and Maryport, and parts of the Rural Districts of Cockermouth, Whitehaven, and Wigton.

1950–1983: The Municipal Borough of Workington, the Urban Districts of Cockermouth, Keswick, and Maryport, and the Rural District of Cockermouth.

1983–1997: The District of Allerdale wards of All Saints, Binsey, Broughton, Castle, Clifton, Crummock, Dalton, Dearham, Derwent Valley, Ellen, Ellenborough, Ewanrigg, Flimby, Harrington, Keswick, Moorclose, Netherhall, Northside, St Bridget's, St John's, St Michael's, Salterbeck, Seaton Moor, Stainburn, and Westfield.

1997–2010: All the wards of the District of Allerdale except the Marsh, Wampool, Warnell and Wigton wards.

2010–present: The Borough of Allerdale wards of All Saints, Aspatria, Boltons, Broughton St Bridget's, Christchurch, Clifton, Ellen, Ellenborough, Ewanrigg, Flimby, Harrington, Holme, Marsh, Moorclose, Moss Bay, Netherhall, St John's, St Michael's, Seaton, Silloth, Solway, Stainburn, Wampool, Waver, and Wharrels.

History

The constituency was created by the Representation of the People Act 1918, which also abolished the seat of Cockermouth. Workington has traditionally supported the Labour Party, although a by-election in 1976 (forced by the elevation of Fred Peart to the House of Lords) was won by Richard Page of the Conservative Party. However, the constituency reverted to type at the 1979 general election when it was regained by Labour. Labour held the seat until the 2019 general election, when Mark Jenkinson won the seat for Conservatives for the first time in forty years.

Members of Parliament

Elections

Elections in the 2010s

Elections in the 2000s

Elections in the 1990s

Elections in the 1980s

Elections in the 1970s

Elections in the 1960s

Elections in the 1950s

This constituency underwent boundary changes between the 1945 and 1950 general elections and thus calculation of change in vote share is not meaningful.

Election in the 1940s

Elections in the 1930s

Elections in the 1920s

Election in the 1910s

 Stewart was endorsed by the Coalition Government but repudiated it.

See also

List of parliamentary constituencies in Cumbria

Notes

References

Politics of Cumbria
Parliamentary constituencies in North West England
Constituencies of the Parliament of the United Kingdom established in 1918
Politics of Allerdale
Workington